Piz Minschun is a mountain of the Silvretta Alps, overlooking Scuol in the Swiss canton of Graubünden. From the heights of Scuol (south side), a trail lead to the summit.

References

External links
 Piz Minschun on Hikr

Mountains of Switzerland
Mountains of Graubünden
Mountains of the Alps
Alpine three-thousanders
Scuol